The Sèvre Nantaise is a river in the Pays de la Loire regions in western France. It is a left-bank tributary of the Loire. Its source is in the Deux-Sèvres department, near Secondigny. It flows from south to north through the departments and towns listed here, reaching the river Loire in the city of Nantes. That city gives it the name Sèvre Nantaise, distinguishing it from the Sèvre Niortaise further south.

Departments and communes along its course

This list is ordered from source to mouth:
 Deux-Sèvres: Moncoutant, La Forêt-sur-Sèvre
 Vendée: Saint-Laurent-sur-Sèvre, Mortagne-sur-Sèvre, Tiffauges
 Maine-et-Loire: Le Longeron, Torfou
 Loire-Atlantique: Clisson, Le Pallet, Vertou, Rezé, Nantes

The complete list is on the French page for this river.

Navigation 
It has a horseshoe weir (Chaussée Des Moines) and lock at Vertou, and a tidal sluice open to boats an hour before and after high tide at Pont-Rousseau, in the suburbs of Nantes.
The river is an important resource for tourism in the region. Beyond the navigable section, the river is a popular destination for canoeists.

References

Edwards-May, David, Inland Waterways of France (2010), Imray Ltd., St Ives, Cambs., UK, p. 284
Sèvre Nantaise with further details by the author of 'Inland Waterways of France' 
Navigation details for 80 French rivers and canals (French waterways website section)

Rivers of France
Rivers of Nouvelle-Aquitaine
Rivers of Pays de la Loire
Rivers of Deux-Sèvres
Rivers of Vendée
Rivers of Maine-et-Loire
Rivers of Loire-Atlantique